Amaurobius antipovae is a species of spider in the family Amaurobiidae, found in Russia and Georgia.

References

antipovae
Spiders of Europe
Spiders described in 2004